El Pintor is a 2014 album by Interpol.

El Pintor may also refer to:

El pintor de su deshonra, a 1640s play by Pedro Calderón de la Barca
"El Pintor", a 1994 song by Hometown Boys